Matthew Lamb or Mathew Lamb may refer to:

Sir Matthew Lamb, 1st Baronet (1705–1768), British barrister and politician
Matt Lamb (1932–2012), American painter
Mathew Charles Lamb (1948–1976), Canadian spree killer and psychiatric patient, latterly a soldier in the Rhodesian Army
Matthew Lamb (cricketer) (born 1996), English cricketer